Shorea almon (called, along with some other species in the genus Shorea, light red meranti, Philippine mahogany, or white lauan) is a species of plant in the family Dipterocarpaceae. It is native to Borneo and the Philippines.

References

See also
List of Shorea species

almon
Trees of Borneo
Trees of the Philippines
Taxonomy articles created by Polbot